House Island can refer to:

House Island (Maine), a private island Portland Harbor in Casco Bay in Maine, United States
House Island (Massachusetts), an island in Manchester Harbor in Massachusetts Bay, United States
House Island, another name for Inner Farne Island